The San Diego State University (SDSU) Georgia, known as SDSU Georgia, is a representation of San Diego State University (SDSU) in Tbilisi, Georgia (country) offering internationally accredited Bachelor of Science programs in the fields of science, technology, engineering, and mathematics (STEM) in the Republic of Georgia. These programs enable Georgian students to receive a high-quality STEM education and earn an American academic degree.

Founded in 2014, SDSU-Georgia is funded through a compact signed between the United States of America's Millennium Challenge Corporation and the Government of Georgia.

Academics
Academic degrees are offered in partnership with three leading Georgian universities and are designed to prepare students to excel in science and technology fields. The classrooms, engineering and science laboratories, and computer workstations are designed to meet the same criteria and provide the same technologies that are used at San Diego State University in the United States.

Courses are taught in the English language by San Diego State University faculty from both the United States and Georgia.

SDSU Georgia diplomas meet the standards of various accreditation agencies, including Western Association of Schools and Colleges (WASC), Accreditation Board for Engineering and Technology (ABET), and the American Chemical Society (ACS).

Academic degrees currently offered are:

In conjunction with Georgian Technical University (formerly the V.I. Lenin Georgian Polytechnical Institute):
 Chemistry
 Computer Engineering
 Electrical Engineering with a Power Engineering focus
 Civil Engineering
In conjunction with Ilia State University:
 Computer Engineering
 Electrical Engineering with a Microelectronics focus
In conjunction with Tbilisi State University:
 Computer Science
 Chemistry with a Biochemistry focus
 Computer Engineering
 Electrical Engineering

English Language Academy
To help prepare students for admission, SDSU Georgia English Language Academy (ELA), in collaboration with the Center for International Education (CIE), offers preparatory English language courses in Tbilisi, Kutaisi, Batumi, and other Georgian cities. The ELA is designed to help prepare potential SDSU-Georgia students who have a solid background in STEM with the appropriate English language skills necessary to successfully meet the San Diego State University TOEFL requirements for admission.

Travel
Students are offered an opportunity to travel to San Diego, California, and complete one or more semesters of instruction at the main San Diego State University campus with the same tuition fee.

See also
San Diego State University

References

External links
Official SDSU Georgia website
About SDSU Georgia
SDSU Georgia English Language Academy (ELA)

Georgia
San Diego State University Georgia
San Diego State University Georgia
San Diego State University Georgia
Educational institutions established in 2014
2014 establishments in Georgia (country)